= Pytheion =

Town of ancient Bithynia

Coordinates: 40°36′14″N 29°13′26″E

Pytheion (Ancient Greek: Πύθειον), also called Pythia Therma, was a town of ancient Bithynia.

Pythia was embellished with public baths and buildings since the time of Justinian I, and was a famous resort town that people from Constantinople visited for its warm baths and their therapeutic properties. Its site is located near Yalova Kap in Anatolia.
